Harold G. Olsen (May 12, 1895 – October 29, 1953) was a college men's basketball coach. The Rice Lake, Wisconsin native was the head coach of the Ohio State University from 1922 to 1946. That year, he became the first head coach of the BAA's Chicago Stags, where he coached almost three seasons before being replaced by Philip Brownstein. Olsen also coached at Northwestern University (1950–1952).

While playing at University of Wisconsin–Madison (1914–1917), Olsen was named two-time All-Big Ten. After graduating from Wisconsin, he began his coaching career at Bradley University and Ripon College. In 1922 Olsen followed George Trautman as head coach of the Ohio State University. In 24 years he guided the Buckeyes to a 259–197 record, as well as five Big Ten championships (1925, 1933, 1939, 1944, 1946). In 1939, Olsen spearheaded efforts to create the NCAA postseason national playoffs, now known as the NCAA tournament. Olsen also helped initiate the 10-second rule. In 1959, he was inducted to the Naismith Memorial Basketball Hall of Fame as a contributor.

Head coaching record

College football

College basketball

Professional basketball

|-
| style="text-align:left;"|CHS
| style="text-align:left;"|
|61||39||22||.639|| style="text-align:center;"|1st in Western||11||5||6||.455
| style="text-align:center;"|Lost in BAA Finals
|-
| style="text-align:left;"|CHS
| style="text-align:left;"|
|48||28||20||.583|| style="text-align:center;"|3rd in Western||5||2||3||.400
| style="text-align:center;"|Lost in BAA Semifinals
|-
| style="text-align:left;"|CHS
| style="text-align:left;"|
|49||28||21||.571|| style="text-align:center;"|3rd in Western||2||0||2||.000
| style="text-align:center;"|Lost in BAA Div. Semifinals
|- class="sortbottom"
| style="text-align:left;"|Career
| ||158||95||63||.601|| ||18||7||11||.389

See also
 List of NCAA Division I Men's Final Four appearances by coach

References

External links
 
 

1895 births
1953 deaths
All-American college men's basketball players
American men's basketball coaches
American men's basketball players
Basketball coaches from Wisconsin
Basketball players from Wisconsin
Bradley Braves baseball coaches
Bradley Braves men's basketball coaches
Chicago Stags coaches
College men's basketball head coaches in the United States
Naismith Memorial Basketball Hall of Fame inductees
National Collegiate Basketball Hall of Fame inductees
Northwestern Wildcats men's basketball coaches
Ohio State Buckeyes men's basketball coaches
People from Rice Lake, Wisconsin
Ripon Red Hawks athletic directors
Ripon Red Hawks football coaches
Ripon Red Hawks men's basketball coaches
Wisconsin Badgers men's basketball players